Casco is an extinct town in Franklin County, in the U.S. state of Missouri.

A post office called Casco was established in 1871, and remained in operation until 1908. The community's name is a transfer from Casco, Maine.

References

Ghost towns in Missouri
Former populated places in Franklin County, Missouri